Jahja Fehratović (born 29 March 1982) is a Serbian Bosniak politician and academic. He has been a member of the National Assembly of Serbia since 2016 and is also a member of the Bosniak National Council. Fehratović was the leader of the Bosniak Democratic Union of Sandžak (Bošnjačka demokratska zajednica Sandžaka, BDZ Sandžak) from the party's formation in 2013 until December 2017, when it was reconstituted as the Justice and Reconciliation Party (Stranka pravde i pomirenja, SPP) under the leadership of Chief Mufti Muamer Zukorlić. He is now a vice-president of the SPP.

Early life and academic career
Fehratović was born in Novi Pazar, in the Sandžak region of what was then the Socialist Republic of Serbia in the Socialist Federal Republic of Yugoslavia. He attended elementary and secondary school in Novi Pazar, earned a bachelor's degree in Bosnian literature and the Bosnian language at the University of Sarajevo in Bosnia and Herzegovina (2007), and later received a master's degree (2012) and a Ph.D. (2013) from the International University of Novi Pazar. His master's thesis was on the poetics and politics of revolutionary poetry, and his Ph.D. was on the literary-historical and poetic characteristics of Sandžačkobošnjačke literature. He has worked in the department of philology at the International University of Novi Pazar since 2009, is a published poet and novelist, and is an active publisher of historical Bosniak literature.

Politician
Fehratović was a leading member of the Bosniak Democratic Union (Bošnjačka demokratska zajednica, BDZ) in the early 2010s.

In 2010, Serbia organized the first direct elections for the country's national minority councils. The electoral list of Zukorlić's Bosniak Cultural Community group won seventeen seats in the election for the Bosniak National Council, as against thirteen for the Bosniak List led by Sulejman Ugljanin and five for the Bosniak Renaissance list of Rasim Ljajić. These results were extremely contentious, and the legitimacy of the Bosniak Cultural Community's victory was contested by both the Serbian government and Ugljanin's party. The council's responsibilities were officially suspended shortly thereafter, although Zukorlić's group continued to oversee what it described as council meetings in defiance of the government's decision. Fehratović, who had not been a candidate in the 2010 election, was appointed as chair of the breakaway council's language and letters committee in December 2010. Later in the same month, he was chosen as president of the Bosniak Cultural Community.

Zukorlić ran for president of Serbia as an independent candidate in the 2012 presidential election, and Fehratović ran his campaign headquarters. The following year, the BDZ split into two rival factions, respectively led by Zukorlić and party leader Emir Elfić. Fehratović sided with Zukorlić. The pro-Zukorlić wing of the party held a convention in early 2013 that deposed Elfić and elected Fehratović in his place. Elfić rejected the legitimacy of this action, describing it as an act of "aggression" against the BDZ. These events ultimately led to party split, and the supporters of Zukorlić coalesced as the BDZ Sandžak in late 2013 with Fehratović as party leader.

A new election was organized for the Bosniak National Council in 2014. Fehratović contested the election as the leader of a pro-Zukorlić list called For Bosniaks, Sandžak and the Mufti; the only other list to appear on the ballot was Ugljanin's For Bosniak Unity. Ugljanin's list won the election, nineteen seats to sixteen. Fehratović charged electoral fraud, claiming that all of the overseers for a special second ballot in Tutin were members of Ugljanin's Party of Democratic Action of Sandžak (Stranka demokratske akcije Sandžaka, SDA S). Ultimately, however, he accepted his list's defeat and agreed to serve in opposition.

Fehratović condemned the physical threats against Serbian prime minister Aleksandar Vučić at a 2015 commemoration for the victims of the Srebrenica massacre, saying that those who threatened Serbia's prime minister did a disservice to the Bosniak community. In making this statement, he urged a full and lasting reconciliation between the Serbian and Bosniak communities.

Parliamentarian
The BDZ Sandžak fielded its own list in the 2016 Serbian parliamentary election. Fehratović appeared in the second position, following Zukorlić; both men were elected when the list won two mandates. Fehratović also appeared in the second position on the party's list for the Novi Pazar city assembly in the concurrent 2016 Serbian local elections and was elected when the list won ten mandates, finishing third against Ljajić's Sandžak Democratic Party (Sandžačka demokratska partija, SDP) and the SDA S.

The SPP gave outside support to Serbia's coalition government led by the Serbian Progressive Party (Srpska napredna stranka, SNS) in the 2016–20 parliament. Fehratović did not have any committee assignments in this sitting of the assembly, although he was a member of parliamentary friendship groups with Austria, Montenegro, North Macedonia, Russia, and Switzerland. As religious fundamentalists opposed to the public recognition of LGBT rights, Zukorlić and Fehratović absented themselves from the assembly during the confirmation vote for Serbian prime minister Ana Brnabić in June 2017. 

Fehratović appeared in the second position on Zukorlić's list in the 2018 elections for the Bosniak National Council and was re-elected when the list won thirteen mandates. As in 2014, Zukorlić's list was narrowly defeated by Ugljanin's. After the election, Ugljanin's group formed a coalition with a third list aligned with Ljajić, and the Zukorlić faction remained in opposition.

The SPP won four seats in the 2020 Serbian parliamentary election against the backdrop of a boycott by several opposition parties. Fehratović, who appeared in the fourth position on the party's list, was elected to a second term. In the parliament that followed, he was a deputy member of the committee on education, science, technological development, and the information society; a deputy member of Serbia's delegation to the parliamentary assembly of the Organization for Security and Co-operation in Europe (OSCE); and a member of the friendship groups with Australia, Azerbaijan, Bosnia and Herzegovina, Germany, Lebanon, Luxembourg, Montenegro, Morocco, Russia, Spain, Sweden, Switzerland, Turkey, and the United States of America. 

He was also re-elected to the Novi Pazar city assembly in the 2020 Serbian local elections. He resigned his seat on 21 December 2020.

Fehratović received the second position on the SPP's list in the 2022 parliamentary election and was re-elected when the list won three seats. He is now the deputy chair of the education committee and a deputy member of the culture and information committee and the committee on the rights of the child.

References

1982 births
Living people
Bosniaks of Serbia
Politicians from Novi Pazar
Members of the National Assembly (Serbia)
Members of the Bosniac National Council (Serbia)
Deputy Members of the Parliamentary Assembly of the Organization for Security and Co-operation in Europe
Bosniak Democratic Union politicians
Bosniak Democratic Union of Sandžak politicians
Justice and Reconciliation Party politicians